High-altitude nuclear explosions are the result of nuclear weapons testing within the upper layers of the Earth's atmosphere and in outer space. Several such tests were performed at high altitudes by the United States and the Soviet Union between 1958 and 1962. 

The Partial Test Ban Treaty was passed in October 1963, ending atmospheric and exoatmospheric nuclear tests. The Outer Space Treaty of 1967 banned the stationing of nuclear weapons in space, in addition to other weapons of mass destruction. The Comprehensive Nuclear-Test-Ban Treaty of 1996 prohibits all nuclear testing; whether over- or underground, underwater or in the atmosphere.

EMP generation
The strong electromagnetic pulse (EMP) that results has several components. In the first few tenths of nanoseconds, about a tenth of a percent of the weapon yield appears as powerful gamma rays with energies of one to three mega-electron volts (MeV, a unit of energy). The gamma rays penetrate the atmosphere and collide with air molecules, depositing their energy to produce huge quantities of positive ions and recoil electrons (also known as Compton electrons). These collisions create MeV-energy Compton electrons that then accelerate and spiral along the Earth's magnetic field lines.
The potential as an anti-satellite weapon became apparent in August 1958 during Hardtack Teak. Further testing to this end was carried out, and embodied in a Department of Defense program, Program 437.

Drawbacks
There are problems with nuclear weapons carried over to testing and deployment scenarios, however. Because of the very large radius associated with nuclear events, it was nearly impossible to prevent indiscriminate damage to other satellites, including one's own satellites.  Starfish Prime produced an artificial radiation belt in space that soon destroyed three satellites (Ariel, TRAAC, and Transit 4B all failed after traversing the radiation belt, while Cosmos V, Injun I and Telstar 1 suffered minor degradation, due to some radiation damage to solar cells, etc.). The radiation dose rate was at least 0.6 Gy/day at four months after Starfish for a well-shielded satellite or crewed capsule in a polar circular earth orbit, which caused NASA concern with regard to its crewed space exploration programs.

Differences from atmospheric tests

In general, nuclear effects in space (or very high altitudes) have a qualitatively different display. While an atmospheric nuclear explosion has a characteristic mushroom-shaped cloud, high-altitude and space explosions tend to manifest a spherical 'cloud,' reminiscent of other space-based explosions until distorted by Earth's magnetic field, and the charged particles resulting from the blast can cross hemispheres to create an auroral display which has led documentary maker Peter Kuran to characterize these detonations as 'the rainbow bombs'. The visual effects of a high-altitude or space-based explosion may last longer than atmospheric tests, sometimes in excess of 30 minutes.

Soviet high-altitude tests
The Soviets detonated four high-altitude tests in 1961 and three in 1962. During the Cuban Missile Crisis in October 1962, both the US and the USSR detonated several high-altitude nuclear explosions as a form of saber rattling.

The worst effects of a Soviet high-altitude test occurred on 22 October 1962, in the Soviet Project K nuclear tests (ABM System A proof tests) when a 300 kt missile-warhead detonated near Dzhezkazgan at  altitude.

List of high-altitude nuclear explosions

See also
Nuclear weapons testing
Nuclear electromagnetic pulse
Operation Argus
Operation Fishbowl
Outer Space Treaty
Partial Test Ban Treaty
Project Highwater
Soviet Project K nuclear tests
The Yekaterinburg Fireball is suspected by some of being a high altitude nuclear explosion

References

External links
"High-altitude nuclear explosions"
Peter Kuran's Nukes in Space: The Rainbow Bombs  – documentary film from 1999
United States high-altitude test experiences – A Review Emphasizing the Impact on the Environment
Measured EMP waveform data and actual effects from high-altitude nuclear weapons tests by America and Russia
American and British official analyses of photography from high-altitude nuclear explosions
US Government Films:
Operation Argus
Operation Dominic
Starfish Prime
Operation Fishbowl
Operation Dominic – Christmas Island
Operation Dominic – Johnston Island
High-Altitude Effects – Phenomenology
High-Altitude Effects – Systems Interference

Nuclear weapons testing

Energy weapons